HMS Esk was an E-class destroyer built for the Royal Navy in the early 1930s. She was designed to be easily converted into a fast minelayer by removing some guns and her torpedo tubes. Although assigned to the Home Fleet upon completion, the ship was attached to the Mediterranean Fleet in 1935–36, during the Abyssinia Crisis. During the Spanish Civil War of 1936–1939, she spent considerable time in Spanish waters, enforcing the arms blockade imposed by Britain and France on both sides of the conflict. Esk was converted to a minelayer when World War II began in September 1939, and spent most of her time laying mines. During the Norwegian Campaign of April–June 1940, the ship laid mines in Norwegian territorial waters before the Germans invaded, but was recalled to home waters to resume her minelaying duties in early May. During one such sortie, Esk was sunk during the Texel Disaster on the night of 31 August 1940, when she ran into a newly laid German minefield.

Description
The E-class ships were slightly improved versions of the preceding D class. They were powered by two Parsons geared steam turbines, each driving one propeller shaft, using steam provided by three Admiralty three-drum boilers. The ships' complement was 145 officers and ratings.

The ships mounted four 45-calibre 4.7-inch (120 mm) Mark IX guns in single mounts. For anti-aircraft (AA) defence, they had two quadruple Mark I mounts for the 0.5 inch Vickers Mark III machine gun. The E class was fitted with two above-water quadruple torpedo tube mounts for  torpedoes. One depth charge rail and two throwers were fitted; 20 depth charges were originally carried, but this increased to 35 shortly after the war began. To compensate for the weight of her 60 Mark XIV mines and their rails, two of Esks 4.7-inch guns, their ammunition, both sets of torpedo tubes, her whalers and their davits had to be removed. She was given small sponsons at the stern to ensure smooth delivery of her mines.

Construction and career
The ship was ordered 1 November 1932, from Swan Hunter & Wigham Richardson at Wallsend under the 1931 Naval Programme, for use as a destroyer that could quickly be converted for use as a minelayer when required. She was laid down on 24 March 1933, and launched on 19 March 1934. The ship was commissioned on 28 September 1934, at a total cost of £247,279, excluding government-furnished equipment like the armament. The ship accompanied the Home Fleet during its West Indies cruise between January and March 1935. Esk was attached to the Mediterranean Fleet from September 1935 to March 1936, during the Abyssinian Crisis. The ship patrolled Spanish waters during the Spanish Civil War, enforcing the edicts of the Non-Intervention Committee until March 1939, when she returned to the United Kingdom. During the Munich Crisis, Esk and her sister ship  were temporarily attached to the 9th Destroyer Flotilla at the Nore, and practiced minelaying on 3 October 1938. Esk was reduced to reserve on 24 June 1939, and was not recommissioned until 2 August. She attended the Reserve Fleet Review on the 15th, and then began conversion as a minelayer beginning on 28 August.

The conversion was completed on 7 September 1939, and the ship was assigned to the 20th Destroyer Flotilla the next day. Esk laid mines in the Heligoland Bight with her sister Express on the night of 9/10 September. She escorted the battleship  from Scapa Flow to Portsmouth from 23–26 September, and then conducted minelaying operations from Milford Haven and Portsmouth through December. On 17–18 December, Esk, Express,  and  laid 240 mines off the mouth of the Ems. She was refitted at Portsmouth from 29 December to 26 January 1940.

On 3 March, Esk, Express,  and  laid mines near Horns Reef in the Heligoland Bight, that sank the  about 13 March. The ship was assigned to the Home Fleet at Scapa Flow at the beginning of April, and was allocated to "Force WV" with the ships of the 20th Flotilla for Operation Wilfred, an operation to lay mines in the Vestfjord to prevent the transport of Swedish iron ore from Narvik to Germany. The ships of the 20th Destroyer Flotilla laid 234 mines in Vestfjord on the morning of 8 April, and later rendezvoused with the battlecruiser . On the 15th, she returned to Scapa Flow, escorting the battleship .

On 10 May, Esk, Express, Intrepid and Princess Victoria laid 236 mines off Bergen, North Holland, and on 15 May, she joined with Express and Ivanhoe to lay 164 mines off the Hook of Holland. The ship joined the evacuation of Allied troops from Dunkirk on 29 May. After repairs to the minor damage suffered by the ship during the evacuation, she resumed her previous duties.

On 31 August 1940, she sailed with Intrepid, Icarus, Ivanhoe and Express to lay a minefield off the Dutch coast, north of Texel. Express hit a mine in a newly-laid German field that night and had her bow blown off. Esk closed to assist her and almost immediately struck another mine. Some 15 minutes later, there was another explosion amidships which caused Esk to break in two, and she quickly sank in position . Ivanhoe rescued some survivors, but 127 of the ship's company were killed.

Notes

References

External links
 uboat.net HMS Esk
 SS Scotia at Dunkirk 
 Service Histories of Royal Navy Warships in World War 2

 

E and F-class destroyers of the Royal Navy
Ships built by Swan Hunter
Ships built on the River Tyne
1934 ships
World War II destroyers of the United Kingdom
World War II shipwrecks in the North Sea
Maritime incidents in August 1940
Ships sunk by mines
Naval magazine explosions